The Women's 400 metres at the 2011 All-Africa Games took place on 11–13 September at the Estádio Nacional do Zimpeto.

The final held at 5:45 p.m. local time.

Medalists

Records
Prior to the competition, the records were as follows:

Schedule

Results

Heats
Qualification: First 3 in each heat (Q) and the next 4 fastest (q) advance to the semifinals.

Semifinals
Qualification: First 3 in each heat (Q) and the next 2 fastest (q) advance to the final.

Final

References

External links
400 metres results at AfricaAthle.com

400 meters women
2011 in women's athletics